Orey Bujjiga ( Hey Bujji) is a 2020 Indian Telugu-language romantic comedy film starring Raj Tarun, Malavika Nair and Hebah Patel in the lead roles. The film is directed by Vijay Kumar Konda and produced by K. K. Radhamohan. The film was initially scheduled to release on 25 March 2020, but was postponed due to COVID-19 pandemic. The film is released directly on Aha on 2 October 2020.

Plot
The film starts in Nidadavolu Town in West Godavari District in Andhra Pradesh State as Bujji's parents fix a match for him. Upset with this, he leaves his town and goes to Hyderabad for his girlfriend Srujana. Meanwhile, Krishnaveni also flees to Hyderabad for the same reason. But the entire town feels that Bujji has eloped with Krishnaveni. When Krishnaveni discovers this, she is upset with Bujji. The twist in the tale arises when Krishnaveni gets to meet Bujji as Seenu. Bujju eventually understands that Srujana is just using him and break up with her. Love blossoms between Bujji and Swathi and one fine day, Bujji learns that Krishnaveni is the girl who has run away from her town and hates him. The rest of the story is as to how Bujji sets things right and wins his love.

Cast

 Raj Tarun as Srinivas alias "Bujji"
 Malavika Nair as Krishnaveni alias "Swathi"
 Hebah Patel as Srujana
 Posani Krishna Murali as Koteswara Rao, Srinivas' father
 Vani Viswanath as Chamundeswari, Krishnaveni's mother
 Naresh as Krishnaveni's father
 Raja Ravindra as Krishnaveni's uncle
 Anish Kuruvilla as Project Manager
 Saptagiri as Saptagiri 
 Madhunandan as Srinivas's friend
 Annapoorna as Krishnaveni's grandmother
 Satya as Gopi
 Siri Hanmanth as Sweety, Krishnaveni's friend
 Jayalakshmi as Srinivas' mother
 Ajay Ghosh
 Satyam Rajesh
 Varsha
 Pammi Sai
 Bhadram
 Riya

Soundtrack
The film's sound track consists of five songs which were released on YouTube. The songs are composed by Anup Rubens.

Track listing

Reception 
Thadhagath Pathi of The Times of India rated the film 2 stars out of 5 and wrote, "Dull, predictable and cliched, Orey Bujjiga falters on many levels and truly tests your patience." A review of The Hans India gave 2.5 out of 5 and stated that "sloppy screenplay will test the patience of the audience." Andhra Jyothi also criticized the film for its weak screenplay, opining that it is devoid of any "twists and turns." The reviewer also added that the film's score by Rubens is forgettable.

The Hindu's Sangeetha Devi wrote that "The Telugu rom-com rides on an old, predictable tale", and added "Apart from a few comic segments that overstay their welcome, the lack of depth to some of the characters makes the film disappointing."

References

External links
 
Orey Bujjiga on Aha

2020s Telugu-language films
2020 films
2020 romantic comedy films
Indian romantic comedy films
Films postponed due to the COVID-19 pandemic
2020 direct-to-video films
Films set in Andhra Pradesh
Films set in Konaseema
Aha (streaming service) original films
Films not released in theaters due to the COVID-19 pandemic